Hubbardochloa is a genus of African plants in the grass family. It was named after British botanist Charles Edward Hubbard (1900–1980). The only known species is Hubbardochloa gracilis, native to Rwanda, Burundi, and Zambia.

References

Chloridoideae
Monotypic Poaceae genera
Flora of Africa